Korets (Koritz) is a city in Rivne Oblast in Ukraine. The city is located on the Korchyk river, 66 kilometers to the east of Rivne. It is administrative center of Korets Raion. Population:

History
Known since 1150 as Korchesk, Korets was fortified by Prince Theodor Ostrogski in the late 14th century. At that time, the town was part of the Grand Duchy of Lithuania.

Between the 15th and 17th centuries the Korets Castle was the seat of the princely House of Korets that issued from Duke Narimantas of Volhynia. After the death of the last Prince Korecki in 1651, it passed through inheritance to the junior line of the House of Czartoryski and became its main seat until the line died out in the early 1800s.

Following the 1569 Union of Lublin, Korets became part of the Kingdom of Poland, where it remained for over 200 years, until the Partitions of Poland. The town then belonged to the Volhynian Governorate of the Russian Empire.

The Korets porcelain plant was established by Józef Klemens Czartoryski in 1783. It was managed by French brothers Francois and Michel de Mezer of Sevres. Its products were famous across Poland. The plant burned in 1797, was rebuilt in 1800, and operated until 1832. Furthermore, Prince Jozef Czartoryski opened here a manufacturer of cloth sash, popular among Polish-Lithuanian szlachta.

At the end of the 19th century, 70 to 80% of the inhabitants were Jewish.

In the Second Polish Republic, Korzec, as it was called, was part of Rowne County, Volhynian Voivodeship. Most of its population was Jewish, with Polish and Ukrainian communities.

A local newspaper has been published here since June 1941.

Before World War II, 6,000 Jews lived in the town. In May 1942, 2,200 Jews were murdered and survivors were kept prisoners in a ghetto. September 1942, 1,500 Jews were murdered in a mass execution. In the summer of 1943, local structures of the Home Army were destroyed by the Germans.

In January 1989 the population was 9437 people.

Historical heritage of Korets includes the remains of its old castle and Resurrection Monastery, as well as the Church of St. Antony (1533, rebuilt 1706 and 1916) and Trinity Church (1620). St. Antony church was used during part of the communist time as a chemical storage facility. Upon arrival of the catholic pater Jozef Kozlowski in 1994, this church was gradually refurbished and eventually brought back to its original form, both internally and externally. Pater Kozlowski was priest and caretaker of St. Antony church until year 2002.

In January 2013 the population was 7388 people.

Gallery

Known people 
 Yaroslav Alexandrovich Evdokimov (Євдокимов Ярослав Олександрович – ukr., born 22 November 1946) is a singer, baritone, Honored Artist of the Russian Federation and People's Artist of Belarus. After high school, despite of innate talent, he studied at Vocational School of Korets (1964–1965 years), mastered the working specialty.
 Rabbi Pinchas of Koretz, a famous Hasidic Rebbe, (1726–1791) is from the town.

References 

Cities in Rivne Oblast
Volhynian Governorate
Volhynian Voivodeship (1569–1795)
Wołyń Voivodeship (1921–1939)
Cities of district significance in Ukraine
Holocaust locations in Ukraine
Jewish communities destroyed in the Holocaust